South Spit is a rocky spit forming the south side of the entrance to Marian Cove, King George Island, in the South Shetland Islands. The descriptive name appears on a British Admiralty chart showing the results of a survey by DI personnel on the Discovery II in 1935.

Landforms of King George Island (South Shetland Islands)
Spits of Antarctica
Landforms of the South Shetland Islands